Zach Budish (born May 9, 1991) is an American professional ice hockey forward, currently playing with the Västerviks IK of the HockeyAllsvenskan (Allsv).

Playing career
Budish was drafted 41st overall by the Nashville Predators in the 2009 NHL Entry Draft. Following his draft selection he spent five years with the University of Minnesota before joining the Predators on an entry-level contract on April 3, 2013. He would spend the next three seasons with the Predators' affiliated teams, the Milwaukee Admirals of the American Hockey League and the Cincinnati Cyclones of the ECHL.

On August 31, 2016, Budish signed for Finnish Liiga team Mikkelin Jukurit. On February 12, 2018, he signed for TPS of Liiga.

Career statistics

Awards and honors

References

External links

1991 births
Living people
American men's ice hockey centers
American men's ice hockey right wingers
Cincinnati Cyclones (ECHL) players
Mikkelin Jukurit players
Milwaukee Admirals players
Minnesota Golden Gophers men's ice hockey players
Nashville Predators draft picks
HC TPS players
Edina High School alumni